Radium is a city in Stafford County, Kansas, United States.  As of the 2020 census, the population of the city was 26.

History
A post office was opened in Radium in 1910, and remained in operation until it was discontinued in 1990.

Geography
Radium is located at  (38.173698, -98.894222).

Demographics

2010 census
As of the census of 2010, there were 25 people, 15 households, and 7 families residing in the city. The racial makeup of the city was 96.0% White and 4.0% from two or more races.

There were 15 households, of which 13.3% had children under the age of 18 living with them, 46.7% were married couples living together, and 53.3% were non-families. 53.3% of all households were made up of individuals. The average household size was 1.67 and the average family size was 2.29.

The median age in the city was 53.2 years. 12% of residents were under the age of 18; 8% were between the ages of 18 and 24; 16% were from 25 to 44; 56% were from 45 to 64; and 8% were 65 years of age or older. The gender makeup of the city was 56.0% male and 44.0% female.

2000 census
As of the census of 2000, there were 40 people, 17 households, and 9 families residing in the city. The racial makeup of the city was 95.00% White, and 5.00% from two or more races. Hispanic or Latino of any race were 5.00% of the population.

There were 17 households, out of which 35.3% had children under the age of 18 living with them, 52.9% were married couples living together, 5.9% had a female householder with no husband present, and 41.2% were non-families. 41.2% of all households were made up of individuals, and 11.8% had someone living alone who was 65 years of age or older. The average household size was 2.35 and the average family size was 3.30.

In the city, the population was spread out, with 27.5% under the age of 18, 12.5% from 18 to 24, 27.5% from 25 to 44, 27.5% from 45 to 64, and 5.0% who were 65 years of age or older. The median age was 36 years. For every 100 females, there were 122.2 males. For every 100 females age 18 and over, there were 141.7 males.

The median income for a household in the city was $21,250, and the median income for a family was $36,250. Males had a median income of $26,250 versus $21,250 for females. The per capita income for the city was $16,608. None of the population and none of the families were below the poverty line.

References

Further reading

External links
 Radium - Directory of Public Officials
 USD 351, local school district
 Radium city map, KDOT

Cities in Kansas
Cities in Stafford County, Kansas